The 2020–21 Segona Divisió, also known as Lliga UNIDA, was the 22nd season of second-tier football in Andorra. The season was scheduled to begin on 25 October 2020. Due to the COVID-19 pandemic in Andorra, the season was delayed to potentially begin on 8 November 2020. Eventually, the season began on 29 November 2020.

Teams
Penya Encarnada won the league the previous season, and were promoted to the Primera Divisió. Ordino were relegated from the Primera Divisió and joined the Segona Divisió. Jenlai returned to the league after not participating the previous season.

League table

Results

Play–off round

Results

Primera Divisió play-offs

See also
 2020–21 Primera Divisió
 2021 Copa Constitució

References

External links
 FAF

Segona Divisió seasons
Andorra
Segona Divisio